State Route 53 (SR 53) is a  state highway in the U.S. state of Alabama. The majority, between Dothan and Huntsville, is signed as U.S. Route 231 (US 231), but the two ends – south to Florida and north to I-65/US 31 near Tennessee – are independent. In those areas, US 231 uses SR 1, sharing the route with US 431 north of Huntsville, where it is referred to as Memorial Parkway.

An  stretch of SR 53, from Research Park Boulevard in Huntsville to just south of Ardmore, is designated as the "Paul Luther Bolden Memorial Highway" in honor of Paul L. Bolden, a Medal of Honor recipient and Madison County's most-decorated World War II veteran.

Route description
Beginning at its southern terminus at SR 71, SR 53 assumes a slight northwesterly trajectory as it travels through Dothan, where it joins US 231, heading towards Montgomery. Between Dothan and Huntsville, SR 53 is the unsigned partner to US 231, however, only SR-53’s mile markers are present along the route.

At Huntsville, SR 53 diverts from US 231 and once again becomes a signed route until it reaches its northern terminus just west of Ardmore at I-65/US 31 crossing several major roads along the way including University and Sparkman Drives in Huntsville. The northbound lane of SR 53 actually enters Tennessee before going south to I-65. Tennessee State Route 7 travels concurrently with SR 53 on the state line and both Alabama and Tennessee mile markers are present on the highway.

This route is the rest of Governor's Drive—US-431's right-of-way—in Huntsville, becoming Jordan Lane after its two-part junction with I-565, featuring Jordan Lane and Governor's Drive. Jordan Lane is AL-53's right-of-way until its northern terminus in Ardmore.

Major intersections

See also

References

053
Highways in Montgomery, Alabama
Transportation in Huntsville, Alabama